Colorado Mills is a  outlet shopping mall in Lakewood, Colorado. The mall has 12 anchor stores, including Nike Factory Outlet, Target, Burlington, Dick's Sporting Goods, H&M, Off Broadway Shoe Warehouse, United Artist Theater & IMAX, and Forever 21. It also has a variety of fast food restaurants, fast casual dining, and dine-in restaurants, including Yard House, Qdoba Mexican Eats, and Cinnabon. The mall has over  180 stores, many of which are outlet locations, as well as many locally owned and operated stores and a large variety of kiosks. 

Walking one full circuit around the mall's main promenade is almost a mile and has a large following of "mall walkers." 

On May 8, 2017, the mall was severely damaged by a hailstorm and closed for six months. The mall re-opened on November 21, 2017, and now features a new modern look.

Current Anchors 

 Burlington
 Dick's Sporting Goods
 Forever XXI
 H&M
 Off Broadway Shoe Warehouse
 Rodz & Bodz Museum
 Target (Super)
 United Artists Theatres
 Slick City Action Park

Former Anchors 

 Neiman Marcus Last Call
 Saks Off 5th (Now Rodz & Bodz)

References

External links
Colorado Mills at the Simon Malls website

Outlet malls in the United States
Shopping malls in Colorado
Economy of Lakewood, Colorado
Tourist attractions in Jefferson County, Colorado
Buildings and structures in Jefferson County, Colorado
Buildings and structures in Lakewood, Colorado
Simon Property Group
Shopping malls established in 2002
2002 establishments in Colorado